Unai Etxebarria Arana (born November 21, 1972) is a Venezuelan retired road racing cyclist, who rode professionally between 1996 and 2007, entirely for the  team. He is of Basque heritage, hence his ability to ride for Euskaltel.

He is not related to former teammate David Etxebarria.

Major results

1998
 Volta a Portugal
1st Stages 7 & 12
2000
 1st GP Primavera
 1st Stage 1 Setmana Catalana de Ciclisme
2001
 1st Stage 3 Critérium du Dauphiné Libéré
2002
 2nd La Flèche Wallonne
2003
 1st Stage 4 Vuelta a España
 4th La Flèche Wallonne
2004
 1st GP Llodio
 1st Trofeo Calvià
2006
 1st Mountains classification Euskal Bizikleta
2007
 1st Trofeo Calvià

References

External links

Cyclists at the 2004 Summer Olympics
Sportspeople from Caracas
Olympic cyclists of Venezuela
Venezuelan male cyclists
Venezuelan people of Basque descent
Venezuelan Vuelta a España stage winners
1972 births
Living people
20th-century Venezuelan people
21st-century Venezuelan people